Musa is a village in the municipality of Aşağı Astanlı in the Yardymli Rayon of Azerbaijan. According to Azerbaijan's State Statistics Committee, only eight people lived in the village as of 2014.

References

Populated places in Yardimli District